Feeling Free is the debut album by American-German singer Sydney Youngblood, released in 1989. It includes the singles "If Only I Could" and "Sit and Wait", which both reached the top 10 of a number of charts in Europe. Other singles released from the album include covers of Bill Withers' "Ain't No Sunshine" and Etta James' "I'd Rather Go Blind". In 1990, the album was released in North America with a rearranged track listing, under the title Sydney Youngblood.

Track listing
All tracks written by Claus Zundel, Markus Staab, Ralf Hamm and Sydney Youngblood, except where noted.
"Feeling Free" (featuring Elaine Hudson)
"If Only I Could"
"I'd Rather Go Blind" (Etta James, Ellington Jordan, Billy Foster)
"Sit and Wait"
"Kiss and Say Goodbye" (Winfred Lovett)
"Ain't No Sunshine" (Bill Withers)
"I'm Your Lover"
"Not Just a Lover But a Friend"
"Congratulations"
"Could It Be (I'm in Love)"
"That Was Yesterday"
"Good Times Bad Times"

North American version – Sydney Youngblood
"If Only I Could"
"Don't Keep Me Waiting" (Dennis Morgan, Rob Fisher, Simon Climie)
"Not Just a Lover But a Friend"
"I'd Rather Go Blind" 
"Sit and Wait"
"Ain't No Sunshine"
"Feeling Free"
"Kiss and Say Goodbye"
"Congratulations"
"Good Times and Bad Times"

Charts and certifications

Weekly charts
Feeling Free

Sydney Youngblood

Certifications

References

External links
Feeling Free at Discogs
Sydney Youngblood at Discogs

1989 debut albums
Virgin Records albums